Major General Sir William George Cubitt,  (born Q1, 1959 in Kensington) is a former senior British Army officer who served as General Officer Commanding London District and Major-General commanding the Household Division from 2007 until his retirement in 2011.

Military career
Cubitt was commissioned into the Coldstream Guards in 1977. He transferred to the Irish Guards in 1998.

In 1999 he served in the Former Republic of Yugoslavia and was appointed an Officer of the Order of the British Empire for his services during the Kosovo War and in 2004 he served in Northern Ireland and was advanced to Commander of the Order of the British Empire for his services in the final stages of Operation Banner.

He was promoted to major general and appointed Major-General commanding the Household Division and General Officer Commanding London District in 2007. He was invested by the Queen as a Knight Commander of the Royal Victorian Order on relinquishing his appointment on 29 June 2011.  He was succeeded as Major General Commanding the Household Division and General Officer Commanding London District by Major General George Norton.

Cubitt was also Regimental Lieutenant Colonel of the Irish Guards, an honorary position usually given to a general officer with links to the regiment.

He was appointed High Sheriff of Norfolk for 2016–17, and a Deputy Lieutenant of the county in 2018.

Family
Cubitt is the son of Thomas Randall Cubitt and Rachel Edith Cubitt (née Capron) (they were married Q3, 1954 in Oundle).
In 1990 he married Lucy Jane Pym; they have a daughter and two sons.

References

 

1959 births
Living people
British Army major generals
Coldstream Guards officers
Irish Guards officers
Knights Commander of the Royal Victorian Order
Commanders of the Order of the British Empire
Deputy Lieutenants of Norfolk
High Sheriffs of Norfolk